The arrondissement of Guéret is an arrondissement of France in the Creuse department in the Nouvelle-Aquitaine region. It has 127 communes.

Composition

The communes of the arrondissement of Guéret, and their INSEE codes, are:

 Ahun (23001)
 Ajain (23002)
 Anzême (23004)
 Arrènes (23006)
 Ars (23007)
 Augères (23010)
 Aulon (23011)
 Auriat (23012)
 Azat-Châtenet (23014)
 Azerables (23015)
 Banize (23016)
 Bazelat (23018)
 Bénévent-l'Abbaye (23021)
 Bonnat (23025)
 Bosmoreau-les-Mines (23027)
 Bourganeuf (23030)
 Le Bourg-d'Hem (23029)
 La Brionne (23033)
 Bussière-Dunoise (23036)
 La Celle-Dunoise (23039)
 La Cellette (23041)
 Ceyroux (23042)
 Chamberaud (23043)
 Chambon-Sainte-Croix (23044)
 Chamborand (23047)
 Champsanglard (23049)
 La Chapelle-Baloue (23050)
 La Chapelle-Saint-Martial (23051)
 La Chapelle-Taillefert (23052)
 Châtelus-le-Marcheix (23056)
 Châtelus-Malvaleix (23057)
 Chavanat (23060)
 Chéniers (23062)
 Colondannes (23065)
 Crozant (23070)
 Le Donzeil (23074)
 Dun-le-Palestel (23075)
 Faux-Mazuras (23078)
 Fleurat (23082)
 La Forêt-du-Temple (23084)
 Fransèches (23086)
 Fresselines (23087)
 Fursac (23192)
 Gartempe (23088)
 Genouillac (23089)
 Glénic (23092)
 Le Grand-Bourg (23095)
 Guéret (23096)
 Jalesches (23098)
 Janaillat (23099)
 Jouillat (23101)
 Lafat (23103)
 Lépinas (23107)
 Linard-Malval (23109)
 Lizières (23111)
 Lourdoueix-Saint-Pierre (23112)
 Maison-Feyne (23117)
 Maisonnisses (23118)
 Mansat-la-Courrière (23122)
 Marsac (23124)
 Mazeirat (23128)
 Méasnes (23130)
 Montaigut-le-Blanc (23132)
 Montboucher (23133)
 Le Monteil-au-Vicomte (23134)
 Mortroux (23136)
 Mourioux-Vieilleville (23137)
 Moutier-d'Ahun (23138)
 Moutier-Malcard (23139)
 Naillat (23141)
 Noth (23143)
 Nouzerolles (23147)
 Nouziers (23148)
 Peyrabout (23150)
 Pontarion (23155)
 La Pouge (23157)
 Roches (23162)
 Royère-de-Vassivière (23165)
 Sagnat (23166)
 Saint-Agnant-de-Versillat (23177)
 Saint-Amand-Jartoudeix (23181)
 Saint-Avit-le-Pauvre (23183)
 Saint-Christophe (23186)
 Saint-Dizier-les-Domaines (23188)
 Saint-Dizier-Masbaraud (23189)
 Sainte-Feyre (23193)
 Saint-Éloi (23191)
 Saint-Fiel (23195)
 Saint-Georges-la-Pouge (23197)
 Saint-Germain-Beaupré (23199)
 Saint-Goussaud (23200)
 Saint-Hilaire-la-Plaine (23201)
 Saint-Hilaire-le-Château (23202)
 Saint-Junien-la-Bregère (23205)
 Saint-Laurent (23206)
 Saint-Léger-Bridereix (23207)
 Saint-Léger-le-Guérétois (23208)
 Saint-Martial-le-Mont (23214)
 Saint-Martin-Château (23216)
 Saint-Martin-Sainte-Catherine (23217)
 Saint-Maurice-la-Souterraine (23219)
 Saint-Michel-de-Veisse (23222)
 Saint-Moreil (23223)
 Saint-Pardoux-Morterolles (23227)
 Saint-Pierre-Bellevue (23232)
 Saint-Pierre-Chérignat (23230)
 Saint-Priest-la-Feuille (23235)
 Saint-Priest-la-Plaine (23236)
 Saint-Priest-Palus (23237)
 Saint-Sébastien (23239)
 Saint-Silvain-Montaigut (23242)
 Saint-Sulpice-le-Dunois (23244)
 Saint-Sulpice-le-Guérétois (23245)
 Saint-Vaury (23247)
 Saint-Victor-en-Marche (23248)
 Saint-Yrieix-les-Bois (23250)
 Sardent (23168)
 La Saunière (23169)
 Savennes (23170)
 Soubrebost (23173)
 Sous-Parsat (23175)
 La Souterraine (23176)
 Tercillat (23252)
 Thauron (23253)
 Vareilles (23258)
 Vidaillat (23260)
 Villard (23263)

History

The arrondissement of Guéret was created in 1800. At the March 2017 reorganisation of the arrondissements of Creuse, it gained 18 communes from the arrondissement of Aubusson, and it lost 28 communes to the arrondissement of Aubusson.

As a result of the reorganisation of the cantons of France which came into effect in 2015, the borders of the cantons are no longer related to the borders of the arrondissements. The cantons of the arrondissement of Guéret were, as of January 2015:

 Ahun
 Bénévent-l'Abbaye
 Bonnat
 Bourganeuf
 Boussac
 Châtelus-Malvaleix
 Dun-le-Palestel
 Le Grand-Bourg
 Guéret-Nord
 Guéret-Sud-Est
 Guéret-Sud-Ouest
 Jarnages
 Pontarion
 Saint-Vaury
 La Souterraine

References

Gueret